Prunetin is an O-methylated isoflavone, a type of flavonoid. It has been isolated for the first time by Finnemore in 1910 in the bark of Prunus emarginata (the Oregon cherry). Prunetin isolated from pea roots can act as an attractant for Aphanomyces euteiches zoospores. It is also an allosteric inhibitor of human liver aldehyde dehydrogenase.

Prunetin can lower blood pressure of spontaneously hypertensive rats and relax isolated rat aortic rings through calcium channel block mechanisms in vessel smooth muscles.

Glycosides 
 8-C-glucosyl prunetin, isolated from the leaves of Dalbergia hainanensis

See also
 List of phytochemicals in food
 Biochanin A

References 

O-methylated isoflavones